John Cramer may refer to:

 John Cramer (announcer) (born 1955), American television announcer
 John Cramer (representative) (1779–1870), US Representative from New York
 John Cramer (priest) (1793–1848), English classical scholar and geographer
 John G. Cramer (born 1934), professor of physics at the University of Washington in Seattle, SF author
 John Cramer (Australian politician) (1896–1994), member of the Australian House of Representatives, 1949–1974

See also 
Johann Cramer (disambiguation)
John Kramer (disambiguation)